Yesterday's Heroes is a 1940 American drama film directed by Herbert I. Leeds and written by Irving Cummings Jr. and William Conselman Jr.. The film stars Jean Rogers, Robert Sterling, Ted North, Kay Aldridge, Russell Gleason and Richard "Dick" Lane. The film was released on September 20, 1940, by 20th Century Fox.

Plot

Cast    
Jean Rogers as Lee Kellogg
Robert Sterling as Duke Wyman
Ted North as Claude Hammond
Kay Aldridge as Janice Mason
Russell Gleason as Bill Garrett
Richard "Dick" Lane as Cleats Slater
Edmund MacDonald as Tex Jones
George Irving as Dr. Stovall
Emma Dunn as Aunt Winnie
Harry Hayden as Mr. Kellogg
Isabel Randolph as Mrs. Kellogg
Pierre Watkin as Harvey Mason
Frank Sully as Curly Walsh
M. J. Frankovich as Announcer
Don Forbes as Announcer
Bert Roach as Dave
Matt McHugh as Joe
Truman Bradley as Judge
George Meeker as Tony

References

External links
 

1940 films
American drama films
1940 drama films
20th Century Fox films
Films directed by Herbert I. Leeds
American black-and-white films
1940s English-language films
1940s American films